Asgar Mammad oglu Abdullayev (born 27 March 1960) is an Azerbaijani retired footballer. He is currently manager of Turan Tovuz. He played for Neftchi Baku as a defender for a long time making 319 appearances and scoring 1 goal.

Abdullayev began his managerial career at Shafa Baku. He has also managed the Azerbaijan U-21 and Azerbaijani national football team, FK Baku, AZAL PFC Baku. He is a currently manager of Araz in Azerbaijan Premier League.

Managerial career statistics

External links
Asgar Abdullayevs interview

1960 births
Azerbaijani footballers
Soviet footballers
Azerbaijani football managers
Azerbaijan national football team managers
Living people
Footballers from Baku
Soviet Azerbaijani people
Association football defenders
Neftçi PFK players
Soviet Top League players